Mazurka der Liebe is an East German film. It was released in 1957. It is an adaptation of the 1882 operetta Der Bettelstudent.

External links
 

1957 films
1957 musical films
German musical films
East German films
1950s German-language films
Films set in Poland
Films set in the 1700s
Remakes of German films
Operetta films
Films based on operettas
1950s German films